is a 1994 Japanese anime series in the Cutie Honey media franchise created by Go Nagai. Inspired by continued popularity of the original 1973 Cutie Honey television series, and first announced by Toei Video in October 1993, it was the only Cutie Honey anime production to be licensed for distribution in the United States until Discotek Media released the 1973 series on DVD in November 2013. Unlike the original, it was developed as an OVA (original video animation), a type of anime made for home video. The OVAs were released by ADV Films in the US, and have also been sold in the United Kingdom, France, Italy, Australia, and New Zealand.

Set one hundred years after the original, it follows protagonist Honey Kisaragi, along with her friends from the Hayami family, as she fights criminals in the fictional Cosplay City.  Honey, a female android, has a device within her that allows her to transform into various personas, or summon weapons and other powers, by shouting "Honey Flash!" The first four episodes contain a complete story in which Honey battles the forces of Dolmeck, a man feared even by other criminals.  In later episodes, she defeats other enemies empowered by her returning former nemesis, Panther Zora. The series staff planned to make at least twelve episodes, but it ended with eight in 1995. A 2004 DVD release included a scripted but unfilmed ninth episode—a Christmas story—as a drama CD.

New Cutie Honey includes many characters and cameos from or based on prior works by Nagai, such as Mazinger Z and Devilman.  It has inspired merchandise of its own, including many scale model kits of Honey. ADV's English language dub of the series features Jessica Calvello, whom Nagai picked for the title role.  Critical responses to the series have focused on its production values and voice work, and have explored Honey's transformations—which often tear off her clothes and show her naked body as they occur—in relation to her strong character traits. It has also been compared and contrasted with other anime based on Nagai's works.

Plot
New Cutie Honey is set one hundred years after the events of the original 1973 Cutie Honey television series, in the fictional Cosplay City.  vows to rein in a citywide crime wave and restore peace. However, a self-proclaimed "Lord of Darkness" named , feared even by other criminals there, seeks to derail his efforts in the first four episodes. Dolmeck then halts the attackers and asks the Mayor to rule the city with and under him. Unknown to all, Light's secretary  is a gynoid who previously could transform into the titular red-haired, sword-wielding heroine Cutie Honey or summon other personas and powers, often after shouting "Honey Flash!" She later confronts the biker gang and Deathstar, another female minion of Dolmeck, and inadvertently regains those abilities and lost memories before defeating the group.

Light agrees to fight crime in the city with Honey's help. He is now both a 150-year-old cyborg fitted with many sensors and tools, and a pervert who often tries to see Honey naked and even asks her to transform to do so. They live there with his young grandson , who has a crush on Honey and wishes to become like Mayor Light; and Chokkei's parents, who themselves attempted to rob a city bank in the first episode. Chokkei's mother  is a self-proclaimed expert thief who can summon increased strength when her son is in danger, and a descendant of Seiji Hayami from the original TV series. His father  loves his wife and son but, like Danbei, is not above peeking at Honey when she showers.

Honey remembers that the minion she defeated injected liquid from a "capsule" to transform into a monster. She fights other capsule users, then seeks the capsules' source. After she defeats a female capsule distributor, Peeping Spider learns and reveals Honey's true robot form.  He kidnaps Chokkei and sends him to Dolmeck's airship, and Honey and the rest of the Hayamis fly there to rescue him; they fight Peeping Spider, defeat Black Maiden, and attack a large structure in the ship along the way.  Maiden then reveals herself to be Panther Zora (Honey's nemesis and the leader of the Panther Claw in the original series) reborn; Honey wounds Dolmeck, and his body releases the fallen evil souls of all the countless villains Honey has killed. Zora then absorbs them, evolving her body into that of a fully adult woman. Honey tries to re-seal Dolmeck's body, while Danbei destroys the airship. After the entire Hayami family escapes the ship with Danbei's jet pack, Honey emerges alive from within a falling rock.

The next four episodes are set an unspecified time after the battle with Dolmeck.  Chokkei has grown older and fond of Honey, and the Hayamis remain with her to fight off antagonists who transform and gain their power through direct influence by Zora.  Mayor Light rarely appears in this half of the series.  A girl named  appears in the fifth episode as a criminal who wants to use a nuclear bomb to get a ransom; she joins Honey's group by the sixth episode, often stays near Chokkei, and calls him "boy" to his annoyance.  Her presence reminds Honey of her old friend of the same name who died at the hands of Sister Jill in the original versions of Cutie Honey and vows to protect her. Natsuko is initially confused by this until Chokkei explains the reason why. Later Chokkei and Natsuko start to have feelings for each other. In the seventh, Daiko—now a leader of a "United Thug Alliance" of gangs—goes with Honey and the Hayamis to rescue fellow thugs imprisoned by an army of "Thug Hunters", and reveals she fell in love with Akakabu for his persistence in an earlier fight with her.  Peeping Spider returns in the eighth, last episode; there, Honey and her friends capture him and use his technologies to defeat a teleporting gold thief.

Production

Background and development
The first anime incarnation of Cutie Honey was broadcast from October 13, 1973 to March 30, 1974, alongside the Go Nagai Cutie Honey manga that had started publishing on October 1, 1973. Fred Patten wrote in the liner notes for Rhino Entertainment's CD The Best of Anime (1998) that the series, even untranslated, was a favorite among early anime fan clubs for its nude transformation sequences and innuendos. Even as brief nudity became commonplace in 1980s anime, the continued popularity of Honey inspired New Cutie Honey creation in 1994. Toei Video announced the series in a press conference dated October 12, 1993, with Go Nagai, series director Yasuchika Nagaoka, Hitomi (the lead singer of the group les 5-4-3-2-1, who perform the series' Japanese theme song), and Honey and Chokkei's Japanese voice actors Neya and Matsumoto in attendance.

The Japanese name of the series, became officially romanized as New Super Android Cutey Honey or New Cutey Honey. It has also been spelled with "Cutie" instead of "Cutey". Unlike the original Cutie Honey, the series is an "OVA" (original video animation), one made for home video formats such as VHS tape. OVAs are known for their higher quality than anime television series, and Toei felt the new Honey was especially high-quality because (according to them) each episode used ten thousand cels, three times the usual number. By November 1994, series planner Naoko Takahashi said that Honey was tentatively set to last twelve episodes, with more to be considered later, but the series was cut short at the eighth episode, released in late November 1995.  Several scenes in that episode have unshaded foregrounds, partly drawn characters with missing legs, or both. A script for a planned ninth episode was produced as a drama CD voiced by the series' original voice actors. Its English dub, made by ADV Films in 1998, features Jessica Calvello, who was hand-picked by Nagai to perform the voice of Honey. In a post at the Anime on DVD forums, voice actor and writer George Manley—who has worked for the Houston-based ADV—praised both Neya and Calvello's work in Honey as examples of "impressive" performances, and said that the series, whose dub was released four years before he began voice work, "was the title, and I often admit this, that brought me back to watching anime and started me on a long road to, 'Wow, I wonder what might happen if I moved to Houston....

Themes and cameos

At the 1994 Anime America convention, Nagai talked about the contrast between Honey and the dark Cosplay City: "I thought... well, what would Honey-chan do if she appeared in a dark futuristic city like in BATMAN. In the movie BATMAN, everything is dark. Dark background and dark characters. However, in the case of Honey-chan, she’s super cheerful and sunny. She really stands out due to the dark background." He believed that New Cutie Honey differed from other anime that focus on settings and characters' expositions, and that Honey instead "makes her own moves, and she carries the whole story". On the relative weakness of male characters in the series, he said, "Honey-chan is like a mother, and she loves to protect weak men. Their existence is her reason to live, like oh, 'I have to fight to protect you.

Honey pays homage to some of Nagai's other creations, such as the Mazinger and Devilman series; the first two episodes alone include many cameos.  The first shows Mayor Light and Chokkei in a picture with characters from Nagai's Harenchi Gakuen, Iyahaya Nantomo, and Oira Sukeban, while Devilman titular character appears as a gargoyle. In the second, a scene in a downtown market in Cosplay City has cameos from Hige Godzilla from Harenchi Gakuen and Naojiro Abashiri from The Abashiri Family; a scene in Honey's bedroom shows a bust of Mazinger Z and a framed picture of her father, Dr. Kisaragi; and several scenes show Mazinger Z Sayaka Yumi, The Abashiri Family Kikunosuke, and an unnamed character from Kekkō Kamen as they get turned into plastic-coated statues. Cutie Honey's skin-tight, full-body costume uses the same design and tricolor (blue, black, and red) scheme as that of Nagai's original manga, but its chest opening—with rounded side edges—resembles the one in her 1973 anime attire. The opening sequence used in the first four episodes shows versions of Honey's original seven forms in the TV series: Kisaragi, Hurricane, Misty, Idol, Flash, Fancy, and Cutie. Danbei's techniques parody those of Nagai's super robots Mazinger Z and Grendizer. Later episodes feature appearances by Akira Fudo of Devilman and Professor Kabuto of Mazinger Z. In episode 7, Honey transforms herself into Kouji Kabuto. The title sequence of episodes 5 through 8 features Sirene, Devilman's nemesis, and Akira Fudo of Devilman along with Mazinger Z's Juzo Kabuto. Devilman can be briefly seen as one of the back-up guitarists for the one-time antagonist Saline in episode 3.

Media

Episodes and releases
The eight 25-minute episodes of New Cutie Honey are directed by Yasuchika Nagaoka and produced by Toei  Video, with animation services by Studio Junio.  Their names in Japan are prefixed by "Stage.", followed by the episode number. Each episode title, from the fifth onward, is prefixed with "". ADV Films released the series in four two-episode VHS tapes with English  subtitles. The subtitled versions were released between 1994 and 1996, and English dubs of the episodes were made in 1998. New Cutie Honey was followed by the TV series Cutie Honey Flash in 1997 and the three-episode OVA Re: Cutie Honey in 2004.

The series has been reissued many times for various markets, and was eventually shown on television and posted on the Internet. Four-volume VHS versions were released in France and Italy in 1996: the French version (also called ) was dubbed by Chinkel and released by Dynamic Visions (now known as Dybex), and the Italian was released by Dynamic Italia (now Dynit). Toei re-released the entire series on DVD on May 21, 2004 as the New Cutie Honey Complete Pack. The release included a drama CD called  based on a script for an unfilmed ninth episode. ADV reissued the series on two DVD collections in November and December 2000, as a single two-disc Essential Anime edition on May 25, 2004, and on a three-DVD bundle with the Kekkō Kamen OVA in April 2008. The series was published on two DVDs in the United Kingdom, released on September 20 and November 15, 2004, by ADV Films UK. Madman Entertainment followed with a two-DVD collection, released in Australia on February 2, 2007 and in New Zealand on March 14. Two episodes were broadcast each month on the Toei Channel satellite television network between January and April 2003 and episodes were shown on the Anime Network in April and May 2004. The Anime Network added the series to their on-demand Online Player service on July 9, 2009.  By then, ADV had divested many of their assets: the company transferred licenses to Honey and other works to AEsir Holdings, their home video distribution arm to Section23 Films, and Anime Network to Valkyrie Media Partners on June 1 that year. The license was recently transferred to Discotek Media for a Blu-ray release on July 30, 2019.

Writer  and composer Takeo Watanabe are credited for both opening themes of the series: "Cutie Honey", performed by les 5-4-3-2-1 for the first four episodes; and "Cutie Honey (English Version)", translated by Masaki Takjao, arranged by Takao Konishi, and performed by Mayukiss for the next four.  The themes are based on the original series' theme "Cutie Honey".  The English theme, which has a softer beat than the les 5-4-3-2-1 cover, is also used for the prior episodes in ADV's November 2000 DVD release.  Three ending themes are used: les 5-4-3-2-1 arranged and performed "Circle Game" for the first and second episodes and "Rendez-vous in Space" for the third, and Mayuki Hiramatsu performed "Legend of Good-Bye" for episodes 5 through 8.

{|class="wikitable" style="width:100%; margin:auto; background:#FFF;"
|+Episode list
|-
! Episode # !! Title !! VHS release date (Japan)

|}

Soundtracks

The music of New Cutie Honey has been released on several soundtracks, and some of the music has since been re-released on compilation albums.  The first soundtrack, New Super Android Cutey Honey: Music Collection Vol. 1 (COCC-11513), was released on February 21, 1994 by Nippon Columbia Co. Ltd. (now Columbia Music Entertainment).  It includes les 5-4-3-2-1's "Cutie Honey", advertised as a "more danceable" version of the original, and "Circle Game".  It also has guitar work by Yoshio Nomura, background music by Kazuhiko Toyama, and dialogue between protagonists Honey and Chokkei.  It was followed by Music Collection Vol. 2 (COCC-11840) on June 21, 1994, which includes a version of Cutie Honey sung by Michiko Neya, along with "Burning Up!", the theme of Saline used in the third episode; by Special Vocal Collection (COCC-12543) on April 29, 1995; and by Music Collection Vol. 3 (COCC-12551), which has the English Cutie Honey theme, on June 1, 1995.

The three-CD compilation , released in June 1998, includes the les 5-4-3-2-1 version of Cutie Honey as the last of its 71 tracks.  The 2004 compilation Cutie Honey Song Collection Special has six New Cutie Honey tracks.

Merchandise
New Cutie Honey and its characters have inspired a wide range of products, and the character Honey in particular prompted many model kits and figures.  The New Cutey Honey Perfect Guide, an art book with character descriptions, interviews, and detailed summaries of the first two episodes, was released by Keibunsha on May 19, 1994.  This was followed by New Cutey Honey Perfect Guide Vol. 2, made for the next two, on November 11 that year.  The two books contain information on other series-based merchandise, such as Honey-themed telephone cards, posters, T-shirts, a 1/6 scale model kit of Honey by Noriyasu Tsushima, pencil boards, production materials, and a carrying case.  A series special called "Flash.1", was released on VHS and Laserdisc on November 21, 1994; it includes 30 minutes of selected scenes from the first four episodes and appearances by Nagai, Nagaoka, Neya, Matsumoto, and Fukami.  In December 2005, a 283-page book by MEF containing drawings and production material from New Cutie Honey and the 1995 PC-FX video game Cutie Honey FX was released.

Two sets of six Honey figures, based on various forms she takes throughout the series, were released by Banpresto.  Both have three common figures: one of her Cutie form, another of her "S&M Queen" form, and one of her Armoroid form with broken armor (which she takes during a battle in the eighth episode).  1/8 scale models of her Cutie and standard "Kisaragi" form—the latter first taken at the end of the first episode—were made by Volks; both show her with one foot on a base labeled "CH".  A 1/6 scale kit of Cutie Honey lying on her side, with her sword in hand, was released in limited quantities in 2000 and 2001.  Three 1/5.5 scale Honey kits that depict her diving suit (from the sixth episode), tennis outfit (from the English-language title sequence), and Kisaragi form were created by Kurushima and released between late 2002 and early 2004.  1/6 scale kits based on Honey's Cutie and Kisaragi forms, and 1/5.5 scale kits of her Cutie and partially armored forms, were created by Yu Makimura of Left-Hand.

Reception

Chris Beveridge of Anime on DVD (now part of Mania.com) gave positive reviews to the two New Cutey Honey Collections released in 2000 by ADV; he "was really impressed with the production values of this show" and called it "quite a bit of fun, especially for those looking for fan-service with a bit more intelligence and style than some of the other offerings out there".  Two reviews of Honey on the website Anime Jump greatly diverged: site maintainer Mike Toole rated the series 3.5 out of 5 stars and called it "tons of fun, a light, tasty action-comedy that's ... spirited and silly and tongue-in-cheek", and praised its character designs as "letter-perfect to Go Nagai's original (quite appealing!) character designs"; Jason Carter praised Calvello's voice work in his review of the 2004 ADV release, but rated it 1.5 out of 5 stars, said that much of Cosplay City "goes back and forth between looking like an ordinary modern metropolis and resembling some sort of Smurf town built of polluted marshmallows", and concluded "The characters are largely annoying, the plot is hackneyed, the nudity is absurd, the fighting is rarely more than average, and the whole thing is ultimately pointless – as the series' later attempts at developing Honey as a person make all too clear."  Sandra Dozier of DVD Verdict was also unimpressed with Honey: "I can see why it is popular—the glossy animation, the well-endowed chicks, the scant clothing. If that isn't your thing, however, there is very little to draw you to this series."

Reviewers have noticed Go Nagai's influence on New Cutie Honey; several considered it among the best anime based on his works, while others preferred different series.  Dozier said that Nagai is "recognized in the anime world as an influential artist and storyteller who is known for preferring extra helpings of nudity and violence in his work", and that such influence "definitely comes through" in the series. Carlos Ross of THEM Anime gave earlier Nagai anime bad ratings, but called Honey "another Go Nagai-based anime that common logic should dictate that THEM rate harshly – except that we actually enjoyed it immensely", while calling its "awfully ugly backdrops, and weird-looking characters" "standard Go Nagai". Beveridge says he greatly preferred Honey over other Nagai offerings, but that "it really doesn't rise up too much higher than thinly veiled fan service with something of a story". Scott Green of Ain't It Cool News praised "Nagai's tasteless sense of strangeness" as the series' "highpoint", saying its "bright American style superhero design, with kaleidoscopic oddity, humorously gratuitous nudity and violence" make it "amusing nonsense".  In his negative review, Carter said the Devilman-based Devil Lady was a more entertaining anime with a similar "impressively built woman fighting monsters" premise.

Many reviewers also contrasted its portrayal of main character Honey as a powerful figure with how it also shows off her body through her nude transformation sequences.  Susan J. Napier, author of Anime from Akira to Princess Mononoke, distinguished the series from more pornographic anime such as Wicked City, Twin Dolls, and La Blue Girl.  Napier thought that the series "sends mixed messages" because even though Honey has great strength and heroism, her transformations are very sexual in nature.  She wrote that "the presumably male viewer is invited in, to participate in the unclothing and clothing of her nude body, while both male and female viewer alike are allowed the vicarious participation in the ecstatic transformation process", but quickly added: "Despite the regressive and voyeuristic aspects of her characterization, she is still clearly the film's hero, one worthy of admiration and emulation ... in the film's several violent scenes she more than holds her own."  Dozier did not share that sentiment: she said "Honey does have some appeal as a fighter and as someone who cares very much about the people who are important to her, but her android past and her family life aren't explored too deeply—mostly, she's too busy getting into compromising situations and fighting evil."

Both Dozier and Yuricon president Erica Friedman wrote about the sexual nature of Honey, including the lesbian desire of the Jewel Princess (one of Honey's enemies) for her in the second episode. Friedman—who had looked for such "implied yuri" in Cutie Honey manga—called the Princess's appearance "*just* what I was hoping for", and praised Honey's change to her S&M Queen form in response. Ross said about the series: "It's seemingly exploitative, it's incredibly sexist, and the female members of my household – you'd expect them to be indignant, but, no, they were laughing their butts off because it was so blatant, and yet Honey was actually never objectified in the whole series."  He further writes, "Honey Kisaragi is an extremely strong character who is no damsel in distress. If anyone needs help in this series, it's the guys!"  Toole said that Jessica Calvello "gives the character a growling, tough-girl charm that was conspicuously absent from the original version", while Dozier said that Calvello captured "the combination of innocence and bravado [of Honey] that is both so confusing and yet so appropriate". Beveridge said the "fight sequences are pretty well done and provide some fun moments watching Honey battle the various demonic forms", but concluded that Honey main goal is to showcase the lead heroine's changes: "Oh, lets face it. it's all about the half to completely naked transformation sequences. They're grrreat!"

See also

Fan service
Wild Cardz (1997), another OVA directed by Nagaoka

Notes

References
General

Specific

External links
New Cutey Honey on Anime Network (Archived)

1994 anime OVAs
ADV Films
Cutie Honey
Discotek Media
Fictional androids
Magical girl anime and manga 

ja:キューティーハニー#OVA「新・キューティーハニー」